The Saskatchewan Marijuana Party was an organization based in Saskatchewan, Canada.

History
The Saskatchewan Marijuana Party was officially registered as a political party in Saskatchewan, Canada, on June 7, 2006. Since that time, the party has arranged numerous events and raised awareness of cannabis issues in the province of Saskatchewan.  On January 13, 2007, the Saskatchewan Marijuana Party hosted its first and founding convention. The Saskatchewan Marijuana Party Founding Constitution was adopted, the leadership and executive council voted on and ratified by the membership, and a handful of policy resolutions were adopted.

A highlight of the convention was the leadership race with Ken Sailor challenging Nathan Holowaty, but Nathan was able to beat the opposition and received a confident majority of the members. The Saskatchewan Marijuana Party ran its first candidate for election during a by-election for the vacant constituency of Martensville on March 5, 2007.  Party leader Nathan Holowaty received 38 votes, finishing 6th out of 7 candidates. The SKMP ran in its first campaign on November 7, 2007. They fielded five candidates who collected 509 votes (0.12%) running just behind the Western Independence Party who ran 8 candidates. In the riding where the SKMP fielded candidates all received around 1.0%.

Party leaders
Nathan Holowaty 2006-2007

See also
Politics of Saskatchewan
List of Saskatchewan political parties

External links
Party website

Provincial political parties in Saskatchewan
Cannabis political parties of Canada
Political parties established in 2006
2006 establishments in Saskatchewan
Political parties disestablished in 2010
Defunct political parties in Canada
2006 in cannabis
Cannabis in Saskatchewan
2010 disestablishments in Saskatchewan